Lana Jēkabsone (born 16 October 1974) is a Latvian hurdler. She competed in the women's 400 metres hurdles at the 1996 Summer Olympics.

References

1974 births
Living people
Athletes (track and field) at the 1996 Summer Olympics
Latvian female hurdlers
Olympic athletes of Latvia
Place of birth missing (living people)